David Andrew Hansen (born November 24, 1968) is a former Major League Baseball (MLB) player, specializing as a pinch hitter. He played in MLB for the Los Angeles Dodgers, Chicago Cubs, San Diego Padres and Seattle Mariners and in Nippon Professional Baseball (NPB) for the Hanshin Tigers. He also was a coach in MLB for the Dodgers, Mariners, Los Angeles Angels.

Professional career

Los Angeles Dodgers
Hansen was drafted by the Los Angeles Dodgers in the 2nd round of the 1986 MLB Draft out of Rowland High School in California. He made his Major League debut for the Dodgers on September 16, 1990 against the Cincinnati Reds, striking out as a pinch hitter. His first career hit was in his first career start, in the last game of the season, October 3, against the San Diego Padres. He hit an RBI single in the bottom of the fifth inning off of Padres starter Eric Show. He remained with the Dodgers through the 1996 season, playing third base and first base but mostly appearing as a pinch hitter.

Chicago Cubs
Hansen signed with the Chicago Cubs as a free agent prior to the 1997 season. In 90 games with the Cubs, he hit .311.

On April 10, 1997, he broke up a no-hitter at Wrigley Field that was being thrown by the Florida Marlins' Alex Fernandez with a one-out pinch hit single in the ninth inning.  The Chicago Tribune called Hansen's hit a "wicked one-out one-hopper."

Hanshin Tigers
Hansen played with the Hanshin Tigers in Japan in 1998.

Los Angeles Dodgers (2nd stint)
Hansen re-signed with the Dodgers as a free agent in 1999. In 2000, he set a Major League record with seven pinch-hit home runs.

San Diego Padres/Seattle Mariners
He signed with the San Diego Padres prior to the 2003 season. After one season with the Padres, where he hit .244 in 110 games, he was traded to the Seattle Mariners (along with Wiki Gonzalez, Kevin Jarvis and minor leaguer Vince Faison) for Jeff Cirillo, Brian Sweeney and cash. He appeared in 57 games with the Mariners, hitting .282 before they traded him back to the Padres on July 30, 2004 for Jon Huber. He was signed by the Cubs as a free agent for 2005 but was released at the end of spring training and returned to the Mariners.

Hansen retired at the end of the 2005 season. He told Baseball Digest magazine that he describes pinch-hitting not as a position, not as a role, but "a state of mind."

Coaching career
On September 26, 2007, Hansen was named the Diamondbacks minor league hitting coordinator.

On November 22, 2010 he was announced as a secondary hitting instructor by the Los Angeles Dodgers.  On July 20, 2011, he was named interim hitting coach by the team. He had the interim tag removed when he was retained for the job in 2012. After the 2012 season, Hansen was dismissed from the position of hitting coach and offered another position within the baseball organization.

Hansen was hired as hitting coach for the Seattle Mariners on October 22, 2012.

For the 2014 season, Hansen was hired as an assistant hitting coach for the Los Angeles Angels of Anaheim, along with Don Baylor, the newly acquired principal hitting coach and former Angels slugger.

On November 3, 2015, the Angels promoted Hansen to hitting coach after parting ways with Baylor. Paul Sorrento served as his assistant hitting coach.

At the end of the 2017 season, Hansen was let go by the Angels, then hired by the San Francisco Giants as their minor league organization's hitting coordinator.

References

External links

1968 births
Living people
Basketball players from Long Beach, California
Major League Baseball hitting coaches
Los Angeles Dodgers players
Chicago Cubs players
San Diego Padres players
Seattle Mariners players
Major League Baseball third basemen
Sportspeople from Long Beach, California
American expatriate baseball players in Japan
Hanshin Tigers players
Minor league baseball coaches
Arizona Diamondbacks scouts
Los Angeles Dodgers coaches
Los Angeles Angels coaches
Los Angeles Angels of Anaheim coaches
Seattle Mariners coaches
Great Falls Dodgers players
Bakersfield Dodgers players
Vero Beach Dodgers players
Albuquerque Dukes players
San Antonio Missions players
Tacoma Rainiers players